Events in the year 1380 in Japan.

Incumbents
Monarch: Go-En'yū

Deaths
July 26 - Emperor Kōmyō (b. 1359)

References

 
 
Japan
Years of the 14th century in Japan